Going for Broke is a 1984 album by Eddy Grant. Following the major success of the previous Killer on the Rampage, this album takes a similar approach but was not as successful. It featured the U.S. hit "Romancing the Stone", as well as the singles "Till I Can't Take Love No More" and "Boys in the Street".

"Romancing the Stone" was intended for the 1984 feature film of the same name, in fact was announced by Casey Kasem on the 30 June 1984 edition of American Top 40 as the title song to the movie, but ultimately was used only briefly, though clips from the film appeared in at least one official music video for the song, and the song is mentioned in the film's closing credits.

A music video for "Boys in the Street" entered rotation on MTV in mid-October 1984.

Track listing
All songs written, arranged and produced by Eddy Grant.

"Romancing the Stone" – 4:54
"Boys in the Street" – 4:17
"Come On Let Me Love You" – 3:39
"Till I Can't Take Love No More" – 2:47
"Political Bassa-Bassa" – 5:06
"Telepathy" – 3:37
"Only Heaven Knows" – 3:55
"Ire Harry" – 4:05
"Rock You Good" – 3:06
"Blue Wave" – 4:01

Notes 

1984 albums
Eddy Grant albums
Portrait Records albums